NCAA Football 14 is an American football video game published by EA Sports and developed by EA Tiburon.  Part of the NCAA Football series, it is the successor to NCAA Football 13. Despite the game's positive critical and commercial reception, no sequel was produced the following year. Due to legal issues surrounding the game's use of college player likenesses, NCAA Football 2014 was the last installment of the NCAA Football series. As the most recent entry in the dormant series, the game continues to be played, with unofficial roster updates being released reflecting subsequent seasons. However, the game is now out of print and has become one of the most valuable and sought after games on the PlayStation 3 and Xbox 360.

Development 
NCAA Football 14 is part of Electronic Arts's NCAA Football video game series. Part of the game's development focused on improving its user interface and presentation, with a mantra to "keep things fast" and "keep things moving". The changes included a streamlined main menu (replacing a graphically-intensive menu design modeled upon the ESPN College Football graphics package), a shorter pre-game segment, more varied in-game vignettes, and a new halftime show with ESPN's Rece Davis and David Pollack. The game featured Kirk Herbstreit and Brad Nessler as commentators.

On March 10, 2013, it was announced that former Michigan quarterback Denard Robinson would be the cover athlete for the game. A fan vote beginning on December 5, 2012 allowed fans to choose what teams would be represented on the cover. After it was narrowed down to 32, a second round of voting narrowed it down to 16. A third round reduced it to 8 teams with players. Players also vying for the cover were Eddie Lacy, Kenjon Barner, Jarvis Jones, EJ Manuel, Ryan Swope, Andre Ware, John Simon, and Tyler Eifert.

Reception
NCAA Football 14 has an aggregate score for both the Xbox 360 and PS3 versions on Metacritic of 77. The aggregate score on Gamerankings for the PS3 version is 77.27%, and for Xbox 360 it is 78.42%.

The game received mixed reviews. GameSpot gave the game a 6/10, praising the on-field action but criticizing the unnecessary experience system, the recruiting process, and the lack of significant changes from NCAA Football 13. IGN, who gave the game a 7.4/10, had similar comments, praising the fun running game and improvements to Dynasty Mode, but criticizing online servers, the dated visuals, and the "generic" feel to the game.

NCAA Football 14 was a commercial success, selling over 1 million copies.

New features 
On July 5, 2013, the new features for the game were announced.

 New Infinity Engine 2
 Acceleration Burst
 Ball Hawk Pass Defense Assist
 New combo moves
 Force impact ball carrier moves
 Force impact tackling
 Hard Cuts
 New hurdle interactions
 Revamped option types
 Nike Skills Trainer
 New run blocking AI
 New stamina system
 Stumble recovery
 New camera angles
 Ultimate Team
 Power Recruiting
 Neutral site games
 Coach Skills
 Coach Contracts
 2013 Season Mode
 New Commentary, Pregame and Halftime Show
 Streamlined Menus
 New chants, fight songs, and player chatter

New teams 
Three new NCAA Football Bowl Subdivision (FBS) teams were added to NCAA Football 14: Georgia State, Old Dominion, and South Alabama. South Alabama joined the FBS in 2012 but had been left out of NCAA Football 13. Georgia State and South Alabama joined the Sun Belt while Old Dominion was soon to join Conference USA. This brought the total number of teams in the game up from 123 to 126. The teams below are based on College Football Revamped

Teams and ratings

Future of series 
As of 2022, NCAA Football 2014 is the most recent installment of EA Sports NCAA series. The main reason behind the decision was the ongoing debate on whether NCAA athletes should receive payment. Many players argued the game series used their likeness, yet they saw no compensation. Despite the series stagnation, dedicated fans have been putting in a collective effort to keep the rosters updated to the best of the game's allowed capabilities via online roster updates and sports forums.

College Football Revamped 
College Football Revamped is a mod for NCAA Football 14 created by fans, it includes updated rosters, team logos, fields, and the College Football Playoff, for NCAA Football 14 was released in the BCS era. 

College Football Revamped has an overhauled menu screen, better graphics and lighting and it has updated team rankings.

College Football Revamped adds all new FBS teams when they join the subdivision, except Liberty. The following teams were removed from the game to add the new teams for the mod:

Idaho to Appalachian State

UConn to Charlotte

New Mexico State to Coastal Carolina

UMass to Georgia Southern

FIU to James Madison

EA Sports College Football 

On February 2, 2021, EA Sports announced via twitter that the NCAA Football video game series will be returning in the near future for next generation consoles, in an iteration called EA Sports College Football.

See also
 Madden NFL 25

References

2013 video games
Electronic Arts games
Video games set in the United States
College football video games
EA Sports games
North America-exclusive video games
High school American football video games
PlayStation 3 games
Video games developed in Canada
Video games set in 2013
Xbox 360 games
Multiplayer and single-player video games
NCAA video games
Video games developed in the United States